Virginia Lee may refer to:
 Virginia Lee (rower)
 Virginia Lee (actress)
 Virginia Man-Yee Lee, American neuropathologist

See also